The summer of 2016–17 saw a very wet start with the fifth-wettest December on record being 76 percent above the average rainfall for the month across much of the country. This caused a significant surge in vegetation growth leading into the fire danger period.

Significant Fires

See also
List of Australian bushfire seasons

References

Bushfire seasons in Australia
Australian bushfire season 2016-17
2017 wildfires
Bushfire
Bushfire
2016 fires in Oceania 
2017 fires in Oceania